Cassida bergeali is a species of beetle in the leaf beetle family, found in Austria, the Czech Republic, France, Germany, Poland and Slovakia.

Description
The females are larger than males.

Habitat
The species feeds on plants in the family Asteraceae, particularly Centaurea jacea.

References

Cassidinae
Beetles described in 1995
Beetles of Europe